Connie Cooner Rowe (born c. 1963) is an American politician who has served in the Alabama House of Representatives since 2014. A resident of Jasper, Alabama, she represents district 13 and is a member of the Republican party. She previously worked as a criminal investigator for the Walker County District Attorney's Office and as a law enforcement instructor and trainer. She was serving as the police chief for Jasper when she was elected to the Alabama House of Representatives in 2014. Upon the appointment of Jeff Sessions to be Attorney General of the United States in 2016 by President Donald Trump, Rowe was named as a candidate to replace Sessions in the senate via appointment by Governor Robert Bentley. Bentley eventually appointed Luther Strange.

References

1960s births
Living people
Republican Party members of the Alabama House of Representatives
People from Jasper, Alabama
21st-century American politicians
21st-century American women politicians